George Charles Calnan (January 18, 1900 – April 4, 1933) was a United States Navy officer who also competed for the United States as a fencer. Competing in four Summer Olympics, he earned three bronze medals (Individual épée: 1928, Team foil: 1932, Team épée: 1932)

A native of Boston, Massachusetts, Calnan did not start fencing until he was a student at the United States Naval Academy in Annapolis, Maryland. By the time he was a senior, he was captain of the Navy's fencing team. Two years later, Calnan competed for the US at the 1924 Summer Olympics in Paris where he finished tied for fifth in the team épée competition. Calnan took the Olympic Oath at the 1932 Summer Olympics in Los Angeles.

Calnan was among the 73 fatalities of the USS Akron crash in 1933. He had a lieutenant's rank at the time of the crash.

He was posthumously inducted in the US Fencing Hall of Fame in 1963, among the first inductees.

References

External links

IOC 1932 Summer Olympics

Wallechinsky, David (1984). "Fencing". In The Complete Book of the Olympics: 1896-1980. New York: Penguin Books. pp. 248, 252, 256.

1900 births
1933 deaths
American male épée fencers
Navy Midshipmen fencers
Fencers at the 1920 Summer Olympics
Fencers at the 1924 Summer Olympics
Fencers at the 1928 Summer Olympics
Fencers at the 1932 Summer Olympics
Olympic bronze medalists for the United States in fencing
Sportspeople from Boston
United States Navy officers
Accidental deaths in New Jersey
Medalists at the 1928 Summer Olympics
Medalists at the 1932 Summer Olympics
Victims of aviation accidents or incidents in 1933
Victims of aviation accidents or incidents in the United States
Oath takers at the Olympic Games
American male foil fencers